Lüneburg (or ; ; ;), officially the Hanseatic City of Lüneburg and also known in English as Lunenburg, is a town in the German state of Lower Saxony. The capital of the district which bears its name, it is home to roughly 77,000 people. Lüneburg's urban area, which includes the surrounding communities of Adendorf, Bardowick, Barendorf and Reppenstedt, has a population of around 103,000. Lüneburg has been allowed to use the title "Hansestadt" (Hanseatic Town) in its name since 2007, in recognition of its membership in the former Hanseatic League. Lüneburg is also home to Leuphana University.

History

Prehistory 
The first signs of human presence in the area of Lüneburg date back to the time of Neanderthal Man: 56 axes, estimated at 150,000 years old, were uncovered during the construction in the 1990s of the autobahn between Ochtmissen and Bardowick. The site of the discovery at Ochtmissen was probably a Neanderthal hunting location where huntsmen skinned and cut up the animals they had caught.

The area was almost certainly not continuously inhabited at that time, however, due to the various glaciations that lasted for millennia. The first indication of a permanent, settled farming culture in the area was found not far from the site of the Neanderthal discovery in the river Ilmenau between Lüne and Bardowick. This was an axe that is described as a Schuhleistenkeil or "shoe last wedge" due to its shape. It dates to the 6th century BC and is now in the collection of the Lüneburg Museum.

Since the Bronze Age, the Lüneburg hill known as the Zeltberg has concealed a whole range of prehistoric and early historic graves, which were laid out by people living in the area of the present-day town of Lüneburg. One of the oldest finds from this site is a so-called Unetice flanged axe (Aunjetitzer Randleistenbeil) which dates to 1900 BC.

The land within the town itself has also yielded a number of ice age urns that were already being reported in the 18th century. These discoveries are, however, like those from the Lüneburger Kalkberg — they went into the private collections of several 18th century scholars and, with a few exceptions, were lost when the scholars died.

Also worth mentioning in this regard are the Lombard Urnfield graves on the Lüneburg Zeltberg and Oedeme from the first few centuries AD. In the Middle Ages, there several discoveries were made on the site of the town, for example on the site of the old village of Modestorpe not far from St. John's Church (Johanniskirche), at the Lambertiplatz near the saltworks and in the old Waterside Quarter.

The ancient town may be that identified as Leufana or Leuphana, a town listed in Ptolemy (2.10) in the north of Germany on the west of the Elbe.

From village to commercial town 

Lüneburg was first mentioned in medieval records in a deed signed on 13 August, 956 AD, in which Otto I, Holy Roman Emperor granted "the tax from Lüneburg to the monastery built there in honour of Saint Michael" (German: den Zoll zu Lüneburg an das zu Ehren des heiligen Michaels errichtete Kloster, Latin: teloneum ad Luniburc ad monasterium sancti Michahelis sub honore constructum). An older reference to the place in the Royal Frankish Annals for 795 states:ad fluvium Albim pervenit ad locum, qui dicitur Hliuni, i.e. "on the river Elbe, at the location, which is called Hliuni") and refers to one of the three core settlements of Lüneburg; probably the castle on the Kalkberg which was the seat of the Billunger nobles from 951. The Elbe-Germanic name Hliuni corresponds to the Lombard word for "refuge site".

From archaeological finds, it is clear that the area around Lüneburg had already been settled (in the museum of the Principality of Lüneburg, for example, there is a whole range of artefacts that were found here) and the saltworks had already started production.

According to tradition, the salt was first discovered by a hunter who observed a wild boar bathing in a pool of water, shot and killed it, and hung the coat up to dry. When it was dry, he discovered white crystals in the bristles — salt. Later he returned to the site of the kill and located the salt pool, the first production of salt on the site took place. In the town hall is a bone preserved in a glass case; legend has it that this is the preserved leg-bone of the boar. It was here that the Lüneburg Saltworks was subsequently established for many centuries.

In spite of its lucrative saltworks, Lüneburg was originally subordinated to the town of Bardowick only a few miles to the north. Bardowick was older and was an important trading post for the Slavs. Bardowick's prosperity – it had seven churches – was based purely on the fact that no other trading centres were tolerated. Only when Bardowick refused to pay allegiance to Henry the Lion it was destroyed by him in 1189, whereupon Lüneburg was given town privileges (Stadtrechte) and developed into the central trading post in the region in place of Bardowick.

The Polabian name for Lüneburg is Glain (written as Chlein or Glein in older German sources), probably derived from glaino (Slavonic: glina) which means "clay". In the Latin texts Lüneburg surfaces not only as the Latinised Lunaburgum, but also as Selenopolis.

Hanseatic period 

As a consequence of the monopoly that Lüneburg had for many years as a supplier of salt within the North German region, a monopoly not challenged until much later by French imports, it very quickly became a member of the Hanseatic League. The League was formed in 1158 in Lübeck, initially as a union of individual merchants, but in 1356 it met as a federation of trading towns at the first general meeting of the Hansetag. Lüneburg's salt was needed in order to pickle the herring caught in the Baltic Sea and the waters around Norway so that it could be preserved for food inland during periods of fasting when fish (not meat) was permitted.

The Scania Market at Scania in Sweden was a major fish market for herring and became one of the most important trade events in Northern Europe in the Middle Ages. Lüneburg's salt was in great demand and the town quickly became one of the wealthiest and most important towns in the Hanseatic League, together with Bergen and Visby (the fish suppliers) and Lübeck (the central trading post between the Baltic and the interior). In the Middle Ages salt was initially conveyed overland up the Old Salt Road to Lübeck. With the opening of the Stecknitz Canal in 1398 salt could be transported by cog from the Lübeck salt warehouses, the Salzspeicher.

Around the year 1235, the Duchy of Brunswick-Lüneburg emerged, ruled by a family whose aristocratic lines repeatedly divided and re-united. The smaller states that kept re-appearing as a result, and which ranked as principalities, were usually named after the location of the ducal seat. Thus between 1267 and 1269 a Principality of Lüneburg was created for the first time, with Lüneburg as the seat of the royal Residenz. In 1371, in the wake of the Lüneburg War of Succession, rebel citizens threw the princes out of the town and destroyed their royal castle on the Kalkberg along with the nearby monastery. The state peace treaty in 1392 granted their demand to become a free imperial town, a status they were able to defend until 1637. The money now stayed in the town, enabling fine houses and churches to be built.

In 1392 Lüneburg was accorded the staple right. This forced merchants who travelled through the area with their carts to stop in Lüneburg, unload their wares, and offer them for sale for a certain period. So that merchants could not go around Lüneburg, an impassable defensive barrier was built west of the town in 1397; a similar barrier was built east of the town in 1479.

The Lüneburg Prelates' War caused a crisis from 1446 to 1462. This was not a war in the proper sense, but rather a bitter dispute between the town council and those members of the clergy who were also part-owners of the town's saltworks. It was not resolved until the intervention of the Danish King Christian I, the Bishop of Schwerin and the Lübeck Bishop, Arnold Westphal.

In 1454 the citizens demanded even more influence over public life.

Since 2007, Lüneburg has once again held the title of a Hanseatic town.

Modern period to the end of the Second World War 

With the demise of the Hanseatic League – and the absence of herrings around 1560 around Falsterbo in Scania – the biggest customers of Lüneburg's salt broke away and the town rapidly became impoverished. Hardly any new houses were built in central Lüneburg after this time, which is why the historical appearance of the town centre has remained almost unchanged until the present day.

The town became part of the Electorate of Hanover in 1708, the Kingdom of Westphalia in 1807, the First French Empire in 1810, the Kingdom of Hanover in 1814, and the Prussian Province of Hanover in 1866.

In the centuries after the collapse of the League, it was as if Lüneburg had fallen into a Sleeping Beauty slumber. Heinrich Heine, whose parents lived in Lüneburg from 1822 to 1826, called it his "residence of boredom" (Residenz der Langeweile). Near the end of the 19th century Lüneburg evolved into a garrison town, and it remained so until the 1990s.

The horticulturist Curt Backeberg was born in Lüneburg in 1894

In the Lüneburg Special Children's Ward, part of the Lüneburg State Mental Hospital, it is suspected that over 300 children were killed during the Second World War as part of the official Nazi child euthanasia programme.

In 1945 Lüneburg surfaced once again in the history books when, south of the town on the hill known as the Timeloberg (near the village of Wendisch Evern) the German Instrument of Surrender was signed that brought the Second World War in Europe to an end. The location is presently inaccessible to the general public as it lies within a military out-of-bounds area. Only a small monument on a nearby track alludes to the event. On 23 May 1945 Reichsführer SS Heinrich Himmler took his own life in Lüneburg whilst in British Army custody by biting into a potassium cyanide capsule embedded in his teeth before he could be properly interrogated. He was subsequently buried in an unmarked location in a nearby forest.

Post-war period 
Even before the Nuremberg Trials took place, the first war crimes trial, the so-called Belsen Trial (Bergen-Belsen-Prozess), began in Lüneburg on 17 September 1945 conducted against 45 former SS men, women and kapos (prisoner functionaries) from the Bergen-Belsen and Auschwitz concentration camps. 
 
After World War II, Lüneburg became part of the new state of Lower Saxony. But the dilapidated state of its buildings led to various plans to try to improve living conditions. One proposition that was seriously discussed was to tear down the entire Altstadt and replace it with modern buildings. The ensuing public protest resulted in Lüneburg becoming the focal point for a new concept: cultural heritage conservation. Since the early 1970s the town has been systematically restored. A leading figure in this initiative since the late 1960s has been Curt Pomp: against much opposition from politicians and councillors he founded and championed the Lüneburg Altstadt Working Group (Arbeitskreis Lüneburger Altstadt) for the preservation of historic buildings. His engagement was rewarded with the German Prize for Cultural Heritage Conservation and the German Order of Merit. Today Lüneburg is a tourist attraction as a result of the restoration and important sectors of the town's economy also depend on tourism.

Between Lüneburg and Soltau to the southwest, a large military training area, the Soltau-Lüneburg Training Area (SLTA), was established by the British and Canadian military, which was used from 1963 to 1994. It was governed by the Soltau-Lüneburg Agreement between the Federal Republic of Germany, the United Kingdom and Canada. The area was located on the Lüneburg Heath and was heavily used particularly by tanks and other armoured vehicles.

The salt mine was closed in 1980, ending the thousand-year tradition of salt mining, although small amounts are still mined for ceremonial purposes. Small bags of salt may be purchased in the town hall, and bags are given as a gift from the town to all couples married in the town. After the closing of the salt mines, the town gained new relevance from its university, which was founded in 1989.

As part of the restructuring of Defence in 1990 two of the three Bundeswehr barracks in the town were closed and the remaining one reduced in size. The Bundesgrenzschutz barracks was also closed. Lüneburg University moved to the site of the old Scharnhorst barracks. The university grew out of the new economics and cultural studies departments set up in the 1980s and their amalgamation with the College of Education (Pädagogischen Hochschule or PH) that took place in 1989. Since its move to the former barracks site the university has enrolled increasing numbers of students. The expansion of the university is an important contribution to the restructuring of the town into a service centre.

Today an industrial estate, the Lünepark, has been built on the terrain of the old Bundesgrenzschutz barracks with its new industrial premises for entrepreneurs. The promotion of trade and industry has resulted in many firms from the ICT area locating themselves there. In May 2006 the nearby Johannes Westphal Bridge was opened to traffic. This links the newly created Lünepark with the suburb of Goseburg on the far side of the Ilmenau. Since 5 October 2007 Lüneburg has been able to call itself a Hanseatic Town; together with Stade it is one of only two towns in Lower Saxony to bear the title.

Amalgamated villages/communities 
 1943: Hagen and Lüne
 1974: Häcklingen, Ochtmissen, Oedeme and Rettmer as well as the Ortsteile of Alt-Hagen, Ebensberg and Pflegerdorf/Gut Wienebüttel.

Geography

Location 
The river flows through the town and is featured in its song; it was formerly traversed by cogs taking salt from the town to the other, larger, ports of the Hanseatic League nearby.

To the south of the town stretches the  Lüneburg Heath which emerged as a result of widespread tree-felling, forest fires and grazing. The tradition that the heath arose from centuries of logging undertaken to meet the constant need of the Lüneburg salt works for wood is not historically confirmed. More likely, the heath was originally formed by clearances during the Bronze Age. The old town (Altstadt) of Lüneburg lies above a salt dome which is the town's original source of prosperity. However, the constant mining of the salt deposits over which the town stands has also resulted in the sometimes gradual, sometimes dramatically pronounced, sinking of various areas of the town. On the western edge of the town is the Kalkberg, a small hill and former gypsum quarry.

Neighbouring towns and cities 
There are several towns, cities, and urban areas around Lüneburg in all directions:

Town layout

Historical quarters 

The motto Mons, Pons, Fons ("Hill, bridge, spring") characterised the development of the town from the 8th century as it coalesced from initially three, and later four, areas of settlement. These areas were the refuge castle on the — at that time considerably higher — Kalkberg, together with its adjoining settlement (the Marktviertel or "Market Quarter"), the village of Modestorpe between the bridge over the river Ilmenau and the large square, Am Sande (the Sandviertel or "Sand Quarter"), and the saline with its walled settlement for the work force (the Sülzviertel or "Salt Quarter"). Not until the 13th century was the river port settlement (the Wasserviertel or "Waterside Quarter") built between the market place and the Ilmenau. The resulting shape of the town thus formed did not change until its expansion in the late 19th century and it is still clearly visible today.
Lüneburg's six historic town gates were the Altenbrücker Tor, the Bardowicker Tor, the Rote Tor, the Sülztor, the Lüner Tor and the Neue Tor.

Stadtteile 
Lüneburg has the following Stadtteile: Altstadt, Bockelsberg, Ebensberg, Goseburg-Zeltberg, Häcklingen, Kaltenmoor (the largest Stadtteil, with around 8,000 inhabitants), Kreideberg, Lüne, Moorfeld, Mittelfeld, Neu Hagen, Ochtmissen, Oedeme, Rettmer, Rotes Feld, Schützenplatz, Weststadt and Wilschenbruch.

Jüttkenmoor, Klosterkamp, Bülows Kamp, In den Kämpen, Krähornsberg, Schäferfeld, Volgershall and Zeltberg are the names of individual blocks within a single Stadtteil.

Subsidence 
The houses in the historic quarter between the Lüneburg Saltworks (today the German Salt Museum) and the Kalkberg were built above a salt dome that was excavated by the saltworks and which extended to just below the surface of the ground. As a result of the increasing quantities of salt mined with improved technical equipment after 1830, the ground began to sink by several metres. This resulted in the so-called Senkungsgebiet or "subsidence area". The houses there and the local church (St. Lambert's) lost their stability and had to be demolished. Because of this subsidence, and because salt mining was increasingly unprofitable, the saltworks were finally closed in 1980. Today, only small amounts of brine are extracted for the health spa in the Lüneburg Thermal Salt Baths (the Salztherme Lüneburg or SaLü). One side of the saltworks now houses a supermarket, while the other is the German Salt Museum.

The subsidence has been monitored at about 240 stations since 1946 every two years. The land has not quite stopped subsiding yet, but it is stable enough that new construction has taken place on it, and several historic buildings which had previously been damaged or demolished have been restored. The subsidence can still be clearly seen even today. Those who walk from Am Sande to the end of the Grapengießerstraße can clearly sense the degree of subsidence for themselves: the hollow in front of them was formerly at the same level as the Grapengießerstraße. This depression extends as far as the Lambertiplatz square.

In the Frommestraße, another sign of earth movements caused by salt mining may be seen: the Tor zur Unterwelt ("Door to the Underworld"), where two cast iron doors have been pushed on top of one another.

Near the church St. Michaelis, other consequences of the subsidence can be seen in its sloping columns and the west wing of the nave. Current subsidence movements can be seen in the road known as Ochtmisser Kirchsteig.

Demographics 

Lüneburg already had about 14,000 inhabitants in the Late Middle Ages and beginning of the Modern Period and was one of the largest 'cities' of its time, but its population shrank with the economic downturn to just 9,400 in 1757; then rose again to 10,400 in 1813. With the onset of industrialisation in the 19th century, population growth accelerated. If 13,000 were living in the town in 1855, by 1939 there were as many as 35,000. Shortly after the Second World War, refugees and displaced persons from Germany's eastern territories brought an increase in population within just a few months of around 18,000 people so that the total number in December 1945 was 53,000. In 2003 the 70,000 level was exceeded for the first time.

The town of Lüneburg, its eponymous district and the neighbouring district of Harburg belong to the few regions in Germany that have experienced such a massive growth. The reasons for this include the growth of areas around the Hamburg Metropolitan Region and the consequent shift of people to those areas. The Lower Saxon State Office for Statistics has forecast that the town of Lüneburg will have a population of 89,484 by the year 2021. More realistic estimates, however, put the future size Lüneburg at between 75,000 and 79,000 in that time frame.

On 31 December 2008, according to the Statistics Office, the official census for Lüneburg recorded 72,492 people (those who had their main residence in the town and after adjustments with other states offices) – the highest number in its history. Currently Lüneburg is the eleventh largest centre of population in Lower Saxony. In addition Lüneburg has particularly close relations with its adjacent municipalities which are also growing and with which it is forming an agglomeration. The town, together with the nearby villages of Adendorf, Bardowick, Deutsch Evern, Reppenstedt, Vögelsen and Wendisch Evern, has a total population of about 103,000 and, on that basis, would qualify as a city (in Germany cities or Großstädte are defined as settlements with a population of over 100,000). The town council has the plan to extend the population by adding these villages to the town area.

 
The following overview shows the population figures based on the situation at the time. Up to 1813 they were mostly estimates; thereafter based on censuses (*) or official projections by the State Office of Statistics. From 1871 the figures were based on those 'present in the town', from 1925 on those 'living in the town' and since 1987 on the 'population who have their main residence in the town'. Before 1871 the numbers were based on inconsistent survey methods.

Economy 
At one time Lüneburg had over 80 breweries. The Lüneburger Kronen Brewery of 1485 in Heiligengeiststraße brewed beers such as Lüneburger Kronen-Pilsener and Moravia Pilsener that were very well known in North Germany. These beers are brewed today by the Holsten Brewery in Hamburg, although the original yeast stock (Hefestämme) was destroyed when the Kronen Brewery was taken over. Only the original Lüneburger Pilsener is still produced as before, although it is now made by the Holsten Brewery and only sold on tap. Today there are just two small inn breweries left in Lüneburg. In the Nolte Inn Brewery (Gasthausbrauerei Nolte) some distance from the centre on the Dahlenburger Landstraße and in the Brau- und Tafelhaus Mälzer in Heiligengeiststraße the tradition of Lüneburger breweries lives on.

Recently Lüneburg has increasingly developed into a venue for tourists. Nevertheless, medium-sized and small businesses still play a major role in Lüneburg's economy. The University of Lüneburg has also generated changes which, together with its student population, have stimulated the economy of the region.

Important local firms

Industry and trade 
Many small and medium-sized businesses are based in Lüneburg. They include the fashion company Roy Robson, DeVauGe Gesundkostwerk one of the largest German manufacturers of vegetarian food and the dairy, which today is part of Hochwald Nahrungsmittel-Werke and makes products, e.g., yoghurt, under the Lünebest label. (The knitware firm Lucia, once the biggest employer in the town, went bankrupt in 2008.) In the industrial field there are large local firms like the car interior manufacturers, Johnson Controls, H. B. Fuller, Impreglon and the electronics company of Sieb & Meyer. Also based in Lüneburg is the von Stern'schen Druckerei, founded in 1614, the oldest printing firm still in family ownership in the world. Werum IT Solutions is the largest information technology firm based in the town.

Tourism, new technologies and the service sector 
The town nursery has created a spa park for tourists and visitors with a 'graduation works', ponds, numerous herbaceous borders and herb gardens which is immediately next to the health spa centre (Kurzentrum). The spa centre has wave pools, salt baths, wellness and sauna facilities, etc. (Salztherme Lüneburg); in addition there is a brine therapy centre which is used for those with skin and respiratory problems. Lüneburg is not an official health spa like e. g. the neighbouring town of Bad Bevensen, but does have special medicinal resources like, for example, Lüneburg brine (containing about 26% salt), which is used especially to relieve those suffering from psoriasis. In addition, since 1978, the headquarters of the conference hotel group Seminaris has been based here. Among firms in the technology and service sectors is Gründungszentrum e-novum, which supports new venture firms.

Governance 
The town of Lüneburg is part of 'State Constituency 49 Lüneburg' and 'Federal Constituency No. 38 Lüchow-Dannenberg – Lüneburg'.

Council 
Local election results in 2016 for the town council of Lüneburg:

Mayor 
Before the Second World War the lord mayor (Oberbürgermeister) was the full-time head of the town's administration. On the introduction of the North German council constitution by the British occupation forces power was separated: the voluntary lord mayor and chairman of the town body was the political representative of the town who, like all the members of the town council was elected by the people, whilst the administration was headed up by a full-time chief municipal director, who was elected by the town council. Since 1996, as a result of the reform of the local constitution, both functions (again) have been combined in the post of a full-time lord mayor, who is now directly elected by the townsfolk. In addition to the lord mayor there are other mayors (elected by the council) who support and represent the lord mayor in his civic duties.

 1945–1946: Werner Bockelmann, SPD
 1946–1949: Ernst Braune, SPD
 1949–1951: Paul Müller, DP
 1951–1952: Erich Dieckmann, DP
 1952–1954: Peter Gravenhorst, DP
 1954–1955: Reinhold Kreitmeyer, FDP
 1955–1958: Peter Gravenhorst, DP
 1958–1961: Wilhelm Hilmer, SPD
 1961–1964: Erich Drenckhahn, CDU
 1964–1978: Alfred Trebchen, SPD
 1978–1981: Heinz Schlawatzky, SPD
 1981–1987: Horst Nickel, CDU
 1987–1991: Jens Schreiber, CDU
 1991-2021: Ulrich Mädge, SPD
 since 2021: Claudia Kalisch, Bündnis 90/Die Grünen

The current mayors are: Eduard Kolle (SPD), Ulrich Löb (Bündnis 90/Die Grünen), and Christel John (CDU).

Twin towns – sister cities

Lüneburg is twinned with:

 Scunthorpe, England, UK (1960)
 Naruto, Japan (1974)
 Clamart, France (1975)
 Ivrea, Italy (1988)
 Viborg, Denmark (1992)
 Tartu, Estonia (1993)

In addition Lüneburg has friendly relations with German towns Kulmbach and Köthen.

Arts and culture

Theatre 
The Lüneburg Theatre (Theater Lüneburg) is one of the smallest, three-stage theatres in Germany. Not only are plays of all styles put on, but also operas, operettas, musicals and ballets. Although the financial means of the Lüneburg Theatre are comparatively limited, it is no 'provincial stage' and can hold its ground successfully against the many theatres in nearby Hamburg. In addition Lüneburg has a large number of amateur theatres, that also produce regular performances. Such a variety in amateur drama is otherwise only found in large cities like Hamburg or Hanover.

Museums 
The historic town is itself a kind of open-air museum (a "Rothenburg of the North"), but there are numerous museums and historic churches (St. Michaelis, St. Johannis, St. Nicolai. The most important museums are the German Salt Museum in the premises of the old Lüneburg Saltworks, in which the significance of salt in the Middle Ages and the extraction of salt is portrayed, and the Museum of the Principality of Lüneburg, in which the town's history and the history of the surrounding area is captured. Also worthy of mention are the East Prussian Regional Museum, the nearby North German Brewery Museum with a gallery of valuable drinking vessels (over 1200 years), the 1485 Kronen Brewery of Lüneburg and the Lüneburg Nature Museum on the edge of the subsidence zone.

Town architecture 
Lüneburg is one of the few towns in North Germany whose historic centre was not destroyed during the Second World War. Nevertheless, the general neglect of its buildings until the 1960s and the damage in the area of subsidence has led to gaps in the historic architecture of the town. In addition the demolition of ramshackle buildings in the 1950s and 1960s and the construction of shops with a contemporary design broke up the historic appearance of many rows of houses. Since the beginning of the 1970s, however, Lüneburg has been carefully restored. The restoration process revealed hitherto hidden ceiling frescos, medieval pottery workshops and many historic soakaways (Sickergruben) from which a considerably better picture of life in the Middle Ages resulted.

In the Lüneburg Stadtteil of Kaltenmoor is St. Stephen's (St. Stephanus), the oldest ecumenical building in the town,  with Protestant and Catholic churches under one roof. Other buildings worthy of mention are the three remaining town churches: St. Johannis am Sande (completed 1370), St. Michaelis where Johann Sebastian Bach was a choirboy from 1700 to 1702, and the relatively 'modern' St. Nicolai which was built in 1407. The Church of St. Lambertus (St. Lamberti) was demolished in 1850 due to its dilapidated state; it stood in the subsidence area.

In addition there are the Glockenhaus ("Bell House", an old armoury) on the Glockenhof, the Rathsapotheke (town chemist's), dating to 1598, in Große Bäckerstraße and the historic town hall or Rathaus with its famous town council meeting room, the Gerichtslaube. The Luna Fountain (Lunabrunnen) in front of the town hall is graced by a bronze statue of the moon goddess with bow and arrow; the original dating to 1532 was stolen in 1970 and melted down; the present statue is a replica dating to 1972. In the area of the old port can still be seen the Baroque façade of the "Old Store" (Altes Kaufhaus), most of the rest of which was burned down and had to be replaced by one that was more suitable for a fire station. The port is also home to the "Old Crane" (Alter Kran), a wooden, medieval riverside crane that is still in working order today and which has two large wheels inside that enable the crane cable to be raised and lowered. The fire station moved in autumn 2007 to a new building on the edge of the town centre; the Altes Kaufhaus has since (2009) been converted into a hotel.

On the southern edge of the town centre is the Lüneburg Water Tower which now acts as an observation tower.

In front of the gates of the old town is Lüne Abbey, a former Benedictine nunnery. It was built in 1172 and has been restored.

Literature

The Lüneburg Variation is a novel, about chess and chess masters by Italian author Paolo Maurensig, named for the city.

Regular events 
 April: "Lüneburg Blossoms" (Lüneburg blüht auf) and spring market on the Sülzwiesen ("salt meadows")
 June: Town festival
 June: "Lunatic Festival": charity music festival on the university campus
 July: Frommestraße Festival
 August:  Heath Flower Festival (Heideblütenfest) (in Amelinghausen)
 September: Oktoberfest on the Sülzwiesen.
 Early October: Master Salter Days (Sülfmeistertage)
 Advent: Historic Christmas Market around St. Michael's church and Christmas Market with Fairy Tale Mile (Märchenmeile) and gable lights on the market place in front of the town hall, Grapengießerstraße and the square of Am Sande.

In 2012, the festival Hansetage took place in Lüneburg. The Hansetage is an event which takes place in a different town every year. Nearly 300,000 visitors were attracted by this event.

Sports
Association football is the most popular sport in Lüneburg, as in Germany in general; ice-hockey and basketball are also popular. Most teams compete in the Regionalliga, which is highly ranked within Germany.

 Football: Lüneburger SK Hansa (formed by merging Lüneburger SK with the football section of Lüneburger SV), Oberliga
 Basketball: MTV Treubund Lüneburg, 2.Regionalliga (Women) Stadtliga (Men)
 Ice-hockey: Adendorfer EC, Regionalliga
 Handball: HSG Lüneburg, Regionalliga
 Volleyball: SVG Lüneburg, Bundesliga
 Baseball: Lüneburg Woodlarks, Regionalliga
 American Football: Lüneburg Razorbacks, Verbandsliga

Infrastructure

Health

Lüneburg has the following hospitals: Städtisches Krankenhaus Lüneburg and the "Landeskrankenhaus Lüneburg", now known as the Psychiatrische Klinik Lüneburg (Psychiatric Hospital Lüneburg).

Transport
Lüneburg is part of the transportation company Hamburger Verkehrsverbund. There are 11 bus lines in the urban area of Lüneburg. As well as Lüneburg station, there is a smaller one located in Bardowick. The nearest cities within easy reach by rail are Hamburg, Hanover, Lübeck, Lauenburg, Uelzen and Winsen.

Education 
The town has one university, the Leuphana Universität Lüneburg (previously known only as the Universität Lüneburg). The university has more than 7,000 students.

There are 14 high schools in the town: 5 Gymnasien, 4 Realschulen, and 5 Hauptschulen; there is currently 1 Gesamtschule, the "IGS Lüneburg" founded in 2009. In addition, there are 6 vocational schools, 3 special schools, 3 private schools, and 12 elementary schools.

Notable people

Until 1700

Lucas Bacmeister (1530–1608), Lutheran Theologian and church music composer
Jacob Kroger (c. 1550–1594), court goldsmith to Anne of Denmark
Joannes Burmeister (1576–1638), Neo-Latin poet laureate of the German Baroque period
Johann von Götzen (1599–1645), nobleman and Generalfeldmarschall
Johann Georg Ebeling (1637–1676), editor and composer of hymns by Paul Gerhardt
Georg Böhm (1661–1733), organist of the St. John's Church, Lüneburg in 1698–1733
Johann Sebastian Bach (1685–1750), attended St. Michael's School and sang in its choir 1700 to 1703
Jean Armand de Lestocq (1692–1767), French adventurer, influenced the foreign policy of Russia during the early reign of Elizabeth of Russia

1701–1800

Johann Abraham Peter Schulz (1747–1800), composer and conductor
Georg Freytag (1788–1861), philologist
Johanna Stegen (1793–1842), heroine of the Napoleonic Wars, she rushed ammunition to Prussian troop in her apron, thus becoming "The Heroine of Lüneburg"
Heinrich Heine (1797–1856), poet, journalist and essayist, visited his parents in the town several times and is believed to have composed his poem Lorelei here

1801–1900
Otto Volger (1822–1897), geologist
Rudolf von Bennigsen (1824–1902), politician,
August Ritter (1826–1908), civil engineer, author of method to calculate for arches, bridges and roofs
Bernhard Riemann (1826–1866), mathematician, contributed to analysis, number theory and differential geometry; studied for his Abitur at the Johanneum Lüneburg
Gustav Wallis (1830–1878), plant collector, who introduced over 1,000 plant species to Europe
Wilhelm Junghans (1834–1865), historian
Ernst Ehlers (1835–1925), zoologist
Charles Schroeter (1837–1921), United States Army soldier who received the Medal of Honor for his actions during the American Indian Wars
Louis Boehmer (1843–1896), German-American agronomist and government advisor in Meiji period Japan
Paul von Hindenburg (1847–1934), general and statesman, honorary citizen of Lüneburg in 1918 for his service in the World War I
Hans Winderstein (1856–1925), conductor and composer
Margarete Boie (1880–1946), author, lived and died there
Paul von Osterroht (1887–1917), World War I fighter pilot
Fritz Heinemann (1889–1970), philosopher

Since 1901
Hermann Alexander Moeck (1922–2010), musicologist and publisher
Niklas Luhmann (1927–1998), sociologist and philosopher of social science
Detlev Ganten (born 1941), scientist
Susanne Linke (born 1944), dancer and choreographer, innovator of German Tanztheater
Annegret Soltau (born 1946), visual artist
Mike Mareen (born 1949), musician and disco artist, grew up in Lüneburg
Detlef Franke (1952–2007), Egyptologist
Mirko Reisser (born 1971), a.k.a. DAIM, graffiti artist
Anjorka Strechel (born 1982), actress
Emma Luze (born 1999), psychologist

Sport
Ralf Sievers (born 1961), footballer
Hannelore Brenner (born 1963), paralympian dressage equestrian athlete
Bahne Rabe (1963–2001), rower and 1988 Olympic winner
Katarina Waters (born 1980), English professional wrestler
Anja Noske (born 1986), rower, twice world champion
Sören Ludolph (born 1988), middle-distance runner, competed at the 2012 Summer Olympics
John Franklin III (born 1994), American football player

Gallery

See also 
 Duchy of Brunswick-Lüneburg
 Principality of Lüneburg
 Lüneburg Sate
 List of the rulers of Lüneburg

Notes

References

External links 

 

  
 Leuphana University 

 
Members of the Hanseatic League
Towns in Lower Saxony
Lüneburg Heath
Lüneburg (district)